Seal It with a Kiss may refer to:

"Seal It with a Kiss", featuring Talay Riley from Double Vision (Prince Royce album) of 2015
"Seal It with a Kiss" (Britney Spears song), from her 2011 Femme Fatale album
"Seal It with a Kiss", a 1980 song by New England (band)

See also
"Sealed with a Kiss", a 1960 single best known as a 1962 hit for Brian Hyland